The Legend of the Sky Raiders is a 1981 role-playing game adventure for Traveller published by FASA.

Plot summary
The Legend of the Sky Raiders is an adventure that involves an expedition by a group of down-and-out adventurers into swampy outback territory, in support of a scientific team searching for clues to the legendary Sky Raiders.

Publication history
The Legend of the Sky Raiders was written by J. Andrew Keith and William H. Keith Jr. and was published in 1981 by FASA as a digest-sized 48-page book with a two-color map.

Reception
William A. Barton reviewed The Legend of the Sky Raiders in The Space Gamer No. 50. Barton commented that "Legend of the Sky Raiders is definitely worth adding to your Traveller collection and, when run, should prove one of the more exciting adventures your players have yet experienced."

Bob McWilliams reviewed The Legend of the Sky Raiders for White Dwarf #31, giving it an overall rating of 8 out of 10, and stated that "Well produced and with plenty going on, the designers have provided referees with as much help as can be fitted in booklets of this size, gone into detail at points in the adventure where it's necessary and not filled out with 'chrome'."

In a retrospective review of The Legend of the Sky Raiders in Black Gate, Patrick Kanouse said "The Legend of the Sky Raiders holds up very well and has a place at the gaming table for adventuring Travellers to this day."

Reviews
 Different Worlds #21 (June, 1982)

References

Role-playing game supplements introduced in 1981
Traveller (role-playing game) adventures